Ophidiinae is a subfamily of the cusk eel family Ophidiidae. The species in the subfamily are characterised by having their pelvic fins situated far forward on the body and supported by a forward orientated extension of the pelvic girdle, they lack barbels on the mouth and chin and they are covered in small cycloid scales arranged in horizontal or diagonal rows. Some species have a modified swim bladder and the anterior vertebrae which enables them to generate sounds. and some of these modifications are sexually dimorphic and make the fish capable of generating sound. They have two rays in each ventral fin and the caudal fin has 9 rays. Most species are benthic and occur on the continental shelf.

Genera
The following genera are classified under the Ophidiinae:

 Cherublemma Trotter, 1926
 Chilara Jordan & Evermann, 1896
 Genypterus Philippi, 1857
 Lepophidium Gill, 1895
 Ophidion Linnaeus, 1758
 Otophidium Gill, 1885
 Parophidion Tortonese, 1954
 Raneya Robins, 1961

References

Ophidiidae
Fish subfamilies
Taxa named by Constantine Samuel Rafinesque